Kosovo is the name of several rural localities in Russia:

, a village in Dzerzhinsky District of Kaluga Oblast
Kosovo, Medynsky District, Kaluga Oblast, a village in Medynsky District of Kaluga Oblast
, a village under the administrative jurisdiction of the Town of Vysokovsk in Klinsky District of Moscow Oblast; 
, a village in Seredinskoye Rural Settlement of Shakhovskoy District in Moscow Oblast; 
Kosovo, Novgorod Oblast, a village in Batetskoye Settlement of Batetsky District in Novgorod Oblast
, a village in Velikoluksky District of Pskov Oblast
Kosovo, Tver Oblast, a village in Akhmatovskoye Rural Settlement of Molokovsky District in Tver Oblast
Kosovo, Vologda Oblast, a village in Nozemsky Selsoviet of Mezhdurechensky District in Vologda Oblast
, a village in Maryinsky Rural Okrug of Danilovsky District in Yaroslavl Oblast